José Carlos da Silva Fernandes Chastre (born 11 February 1993) is a Portuguese professional footballer who plays as a goalkeeper for F.C. Oliveira do Hospital.

Club career
Born in Matosinhos, Chastre joined local Leixões SC's youth system in 2007, aged 14. On 4 August 2013, he made his competitive debut for the first team, appearing in a 3–2 home win against Atlético Clube de Portugal in the first round of the Taça da Liga. His first match in the Segunda Liga took place on 22 January of the following year, being one of seven players sent off in a 1–1 draw at Sporting CP B.

Chastre became first choice in the 2014–15 season, playing 30 of the first 34 league fixtures. However, in March 2015, he cut ties with the club claiming unpaid wages, going on to represent still in the second tier F.C. Famalicão and C.F. União.

On 2 August 2018, Chastre signed a three-year contract with Italian Serie C team F.C. Rieti. The following 10 May, he left by mutual consent.

Chaster joined second-division side C.D. Mafra in July 2019. His spell there was undermined by a scaphoid bone injury, and he left after only two Taça de Portugal appearances.

After one year of inactivity, Chastre resumed his career in the lower leagues, with S.C. Salgueiros and F.C. Oliveira do Hospital.

References

External links

Portuguese League profile 

1993 births
Living people
Sportspeople from Matosinhos
Portuguese footballers
Association football goalkeepers
Liga Portugal 2 players
Campeonato de Portugal (league) players
Leixões S.C. players
F.C. Famalicão players
C.F. União players
C.D. Mafra players
S.C. Salgueiros players
F.C. Oliveira do Hospital players
Serie C players
F.C. Rieti players
Portuguese expatriate footballers
Expatriate footballers in Italy
Portuguese expatriate sportspeople in Italy